The 1989 United States motorcycle Grand Prix was the third round of the 1989 Grand Prix motorcycle racing season. It took place on the weekend of April 14–16, 1989 at Laguna Seca.

500 cc race report
At the front of the grid, it’s Wayne Rainey, Kevin Schwantz, Wayne Gardner, Kevin Magee and Christian Sarron. Eddie Lawson moves from 6th to 2nd in the first turn. Rainey begins to pull away, with Lawson and Schwantz getting into a scrap that leads Lawson into making a mistake on the entry to the Corkscrew, pushing him back into the group of Gardner, Magee and Sarron.

Gardner crashes out, breaking his leg. Lawson takes advantage of fuel-delivery problems Magee's Yamaha YZR 500 has on the last lap, making it an all-American podium with Rainey and Schwantz in first and second place.

On the cool-down lap, Magee is frustrated and starts a burnout just past turn five. Bubba Shobert is talking with Eddie Lawson as they cruise at low speed and doesn't see Magee. He accidentally clips Magee on his right side and gets slammed to the pavement. Shobert has serious head injuries that end his racing career, and Magee has a broken ankle. With Magee and Gardner both injured, Wayne Rainey’s lead in the standings can be threatened by Lawson getting the Honda set-up properly or Schwantz finishing races.

500 cc classification

References

United States motorcycle Grand Prix
United States
Motorcycle
United States motorcycle